Pieter van der Does (born 1968/69) is a Dutch Internet entrepreneur, and the co-founder and chief executive officer (CEO) of Adyen.

Early life
Van der Does earned a master's degree in economics from the University of Amsterdam.

Career
Van der Does was chief commerce officer at Bibit Global Payment Services until it was bought by Royal Bank of Scotland in 2004, after which he was a board member until 2006.

In 2006, van der Does co-founded Adyen.

In June 2018, after Adyen's IPO, based his 4.8% stake in the company was valued at $800 million.

In 2020 van der Does has been listed for the first time in Forbes Billionaire list.

Personal life
Van der Does is married, and lives in Amsterdam, Netherlands.

References

1960s births
Living people
Dutch company founders
Dutch chief executives
University of Amsterdam alumni